Somebody Else's Fire is a studio album by American country artist Janie Fricke. It was released in June 1985 via Columbia Records and was a collection of ten tracks. The disc was the tenth studio record released in Fricke's music career. The album reached the American country LP's chart in 1985 and spawned three singles. Its highest-charting single was the lead release titled "She's Single Again", which climbed to the number two spot in the United States and Canada. The album received a favorable review from AllMusic.

Background and content
In the mid-1980s, Janie Fricke established an up-tempo country pop style that brought her a series of number one country singles like "He's a Heartache" and "Let's Stop Talkin' About It". This led to her winning the "Female Vocalist of the Year" accolade from the Country Music Association in 1982 and 1983. As the country genre was moving away from country-pop, Fricke transitioned towards a traditional country style. In an interview with the Chicago Tribune, she also explained her country pop was becoming formulaic: "You can only do so much of one thing--the real hard, fast, stomping beat." 

Somebody Else's Fire was recorded with producer Bob Montgomery at the Bennett House studio in February 1985. It was Fricke's fourth album produced by Montgomery. A total of ten track comprised the project. Most of the project's songs were original recordings. Among its songs was the track "She's Single Again", which was also recorded by Reba McEntire for her 1985 album Have I Got a Deal for You.

Release, reception and singles

Somebody Else's Fire was released in June 1985 on Columbia Records. The disc marked Fricke's tenth studio album release in her career. It was distributed as a vinyl LP and a cassette with identical track listings. Both formats featured five recordings on either side of the discs. The album debuted on America's Billboard Top Country Albums chart in July 1985. It spent a total of 39 weeks on the chart and reached the number 21 spot. The record received a positive review from James Chrispell of AllMusic, who rated it three out of five stars. He highlighted several of its tracks including "Easy to Please" and "Party Shoes" and commented, "Somebody Else's Fire is a typically fine collection of tunes from one of the finest contemporary country singers of the '80s."

Three singles were spawned from Somebody Else's Fire. Its first release was "She's Single Again", which was issued by Columbia Records in April 1985. The song spent 22 weeks on the Billboard Hot Country Songs chart and peaked at number two by August 1985. In August 1985, the title track was spawned as the next single. It spent 23 weeks on the Billboard country chart peaked at number four. The final single spawned was the track "Easy to Please", which reached number five on the Billboard country chart after 22 weeks. On Canada's RPM Country chart, all three singles reached charting positions. "She's Single Again" was its highest-charting single in Canada, also reaching the number two position.

Track listing

Personnel
All credits are adapted from the liner notes of Somebody Else's Fire.

Musical personnel
 Janie Fricke - lead and backing vocals
 Larry Byrom – acoustic guitar, electric guitar
 Kenny Mims – electric guitar
 Thomas Hannum – steel guitar
 Mary Ann Kennedy – backing vocals
 The Nashville String Machine – strings
 Ron Oates – keyboards
 Pam Rose – backing vocals
 James Stroud – drums
 William C. Warren – backing vocals
 Tony Wiggins – backing vocals
 Benny Wilson – backing vocals
 Bob Wray – bass

Technical personnel
 Don Cobb – second engineer
 Gene Eichelberger – first engineer
 Bob Montgomery – producer
 Ron Oates – arrangements
 Danny Purcell – mastering

Charts

Release history

References

1985 albums
Albums produced by Bob Montgomery (songwriter)
Columbia Records albums
Janie Fricke albums